WJOS-LD is a broadcast television station licensed to Pomeroy, Ohio, serving Pomeroy and Middleport in Ohio and Mason and New Haven in West Virginia. WJOS-LD is owned and operated by William A. Barnhardt.

See also
Channel 45 digital TV stations in the United States
Channel 58 virtual TV stations in the United States

External links
WJOS-LD Online

Television stations in Ohio
Low-power television stations in the United States